In mathematics, especially the field of computational group theory, a Schreier vector is a tool for reducing the time and space complexity required to calculate orbits of a permutation group.

Overview

Suppose G is a finite group with generating sequence  which acts on the finite set . This vector can then be used to find an element  satisfying , for any . Use of Schreier vectors to perform this requires less storage space and time complexity than storing these g explicitly.

Formal definition

All variables used here are defined in the overview.

 
  for

Use in algorithms

Here we illustrate, using pseudocode, the use of Schreier vectors in two algorithms

 Algorithm to compute the orbit of ω under G and the corresponding Schreier vector

Input: ω in Ω, 

for i in { 0, 1, …, n }:
set v[i] = 0

set orbit = { ω }, v[ω] = −1

for α in orbit and i in { 1, 2, …, r }:
if  is not in orbit:
append  to orbit
set 

return orbit, v

 Algorithm to find a g in G such that ωg = α for some α in Ω, using the v from the first algorithm

Input: v, α, X

if v[α] = 0:
return false

set g = e, and k = v[α] (where e is the identity element of G)

while k ≠ −1:
set 

return g

References

Computational group theory
Permutation groups